One Day in September is a 1999 documentary film directed by Kevin Macdonald examining the 5 September 1972 murder of 11 Israeli athletes at the 1972 Summer Olympics in Munich, Germany. Michael Douglas provides the sparse narration throughout the film.

The film won the Academy Award for Best Documentary Feature at the 72nd Academy Awards, on 26 March 2000.

Summary

The documentary begins with an advertisement by the Munich Tourism Bureau with a beautiful young girl inviting the world to visit the city for the Olympics, then shows interviews with the wives of some of the murdered athletes, including Ankie Spitzer, widow of fencing coach Andre Spitzer. The film also features the first known filmed interview with Jamal Al-Gashey, a surviving terrorist. Al-Gashey, who is in hiding in Africa, wears a cap and sunglasses and his face is slightly blurred.

There are various shots of the Games getting under way, and attention is given to the lax security the Germans had at the Games. The terrorists are seen preparing for the assault; Al-Gashey claims that he and the other members were trained in Libya before going to West Germany to begin the assault.

The assault is described by Al-Gashey as well as by some of the German security staff present. Footage of ABC anchor Jim McKay is interspersed, along with sound clips of Peter Jennings, to give an impression of events unfolding as they happened. General Ulrich Wegener, founder of the German counter-terrorist unit GSG 9, was also interviewed during the film, and was roundly criticized for his seemingly flippant attitude about the subject matter.

The film offers evidence supporting the allegation that the rescue operation was poorly planned and executed; for instance, the German police aboard the getaway aeroplane voted to abandon their mission without consulting the central command, while the snipers were not prepared and were poorly positioned. The film implies that had the German government prepared better, the athletes might have been saved. Former Mossad Director Zvi Zamir, who was present at the airport during the final gunfight, is interviewed about his views on the failed rescue (he had previously been interviewed on this subject in an NBC profile of the Munich massacre broadcast during the Barcelona Olympics). At the end of the section, graphic photographs of the dead Israelis and Palestinians are shown in a photo-montage set to the Deep Purple song "Child in Time".

The film also alleges that the 29 October hijacking of a Lufthansa jet and the subsequent release of the three surviving Black September members in exchange for the hostages was a set-up by the German government, who did not want their failings to be made obvious in the trial.

Reception

After the film's release, film critic Roger Ebert recommended the film, stating that it "grips the attention and is exciting and involving. I recommend it on that basis--and also because of the new information it contains." He also stated that "Macdonald brings remarkable research to the film" and "he relentlessly builds up a case against the way the Germans and the International Olympic Committee handled the crisis." However, Ebert criticized the style of the film, and the film's "tasteless conclusion", which included a montage of action shots and photos of victims' corpses with a rock music score.

Concerns about screenings for Academy Awards
Roger Ebert continued his criticisms after the film received an Academy Award, claiming that the producer, Arthur Cohn, intentionally subverts the Academy's documentary and foreign film by-laws – which dictate that only members who have seen all nominated films may vote – by limiting screenings of his films to a small group of invited people; "by limiting those who have seen his, Cohn shrinks the voting pool and improves his odds."

Joe Berlinger, director of the documentaries Brother's Keeper and Paradise Lost, joined Ebert in criticizing Arthur Cohn's method of screening his films, but stressed that the problem is the Academy by-laws: "Until there is a documentary branch of the Academy that treats docs like any other film in any other category, nothing will change, despite the recent band-aid attempt to improve the situation."

See also 
 Munich '72 and Beyond 
 Munich (2005)

Notes

Companion book
 Reeve, Simon (New York, 2001), One Day in September: the full story of the 1972 Munich Olympic massacre and the Israeli operation 'Wrath of God'

External links
 One Day in September  at Passion Pictures
 
  
 
 

1999 films
Best Documentary Feature Academy Award winners
Documentary films about terrorism
Documentary films about the Israeli–Palestinian conflict
Munich massacre
Films set in Munich
Films directed by Kevin Macdonald (director)
Films scored by Alex Heffes
Documentary films about the Olympics
Films about the 1972 Summer Olympics
1999 documentary films
Films produced by John Battsek
Sony Pictures Classics films
1990s English-language films
British sports documentary films
1990s British films